Koski Glacier is an east-flowing glacier,  long, draining the east-central portion of the Dominion Range icecap, Antarctica. The glacier lies close north of Vandament Glacier, whose flow it parallels, and terminates at Mill Glacier just southeast of Browns Butte. It was named by the Advisory Committee on Antarctic Names for Raymond J. Koski, a United States Antarctic Research Program engineer on several traverses originating at the South Pole Station 1962–63, 1963–64 and 1964–65.

References

Glaciers of Dufek Coast